The Hungary women's national artistic gymnastics team represents Hungary in FIG international competitions.

History
Hungary has won the silver medal in the Olympic team competition three-times: 1948, 1952, and 1956.

Senior roster

Team competition results

Olympic Games
 1936 —  bronze medal
 Margit Csillik, Margit Kalocsai, Ilona Madary, Gabriella Mészáros, Margit Nagy-Sándor, Olga Törös, Judit Tóth, Eszter Voit
 1948 —  silver medal
 Erzsébet Balázs, Irén Daruházi-Karcsics, Anna Fehér, Erzsébet Gulyás-Köteles, Margit Nagy-Sándor, Edit Perényi-Weckinger, Olga Tass, Mária Zalai-Kövi
 1952 —  silver medal
 Irén Daruházi-Karcsics, Erzsébet Gulyás-Köteles, Ágnes Keleti, Margit Korondi, Andrea Molnár-Bodó, Edit Perényi-Weckinger, Olga Tass, Mária Zalai-Kövi
 1956 —  silver medal
 Erzsébet Gulyás-Köteles, Ágnes Keleti, Alice Kertész, Margit Korondi, Andrea Molnár-Bodó, Olga Tass
 1960 — 7th place
 Mária Bencsik, Anikó Ducza, Klára Förstner, Judit Füle, Katalin Müller, Olga Tass
 1964 — 5th place
 Anikó Ducza, Gyöngyi Mák-Kovács, Katalin Makray, Katalin Müller, Márta Tolnai, Mária Tressel
 1968 — 5th place
 Ágnes Bánfai, Ilona Békési, Anikó Ducza, Katalin Makray, Katalin Müller, Márta Tolnai
 1972 —  bronze medal
 Ilona Békési, Mónika Császár, Márta Kelemen, Anikó Kéry, Krisztina Medveczky, Zsuzsa Nagy
 1976 — 4th place
 Márta Egervári, Márta Kelemen, Mária Lővey, Krisztina Medveczky, Éva Óvári, Margit Tóth
 1980 — 5th place
 Lenke Almási, Erika Csányi, Márta Egervári, Erika Flander, Erzsébet Hanti, Éva Óvári
 1984 – did not participate due to boycott 
 1988 — 8th place
 Zsuzsa Csisztu, Andrea Ladányi, Ágnes Miskó, Zsuzsanna Miskó, Eszter Óváry, Beáta Storczer
 1992 — 6th place
 Bernadett Balázs, Ildikó Balog, Kinga Horváth, Andrea Molnár, Krisztina Molnár, Henrietta Ónodi
 1996 — 9th place
 Ildikó Balog, Nikolett Krausz, Andrea Molnár, Adrienn Nyeste, Henrietta Ónodi, Eszter Óváry, Adrienn Varga

World Championships
 1934 –  silver medal
 1954 –  silver medal
 Eva Banati, Ilona Bánhegyi Milanovits, Irén Daruházi-Karcsics, Erzsébet Gulyás-Köteles, Ágnes Keleti, Alice Kertész, Edit Perényi-Weckinger, Olga Tass
 1958 – 5th place
 1962 – 4th place
 1966 – 5th place
 1970 – 6th place
 Ágnes Bánfai, Ilona Békési, Mária Gál, Margit Horváth, Márta Kelemen, Zsuzsa Nagy
 1974 –  bronze medal
 Ágnes Bánfai, Mónika Császár, Márta Egervári, Zsuzsa Matulai, Krisztina Medveczky, Zsuzsa Nagy
 1989 – 9th place
 1991 – 8th place
 1994 – 11th place
 1997 – 10th place
 2010 – 23rd place
 2011 – 20th place
 2014 – 20th place
 Dorina Böczögő, Tünde Csillag, Luca Diveky, Enikő Horváth, Noémi Makra, Eszter Romhányi
 2015 – 18th place
Dorina Böczögő, Boglárka Dévai, Luca Diveky, Kitti Honti, Enikő Horváth, Noémi Makra
 2018 – 17th place
Dorina Böczögő, Nora Feher, Zsófia Kovács, Noémi Makra, Sára Péter
 2019 – 18th place
Dorina Böczögő, Zsófia Kovács, Noémi Makra, Sára Péter, Bianka Schermann

Most decorated gymnasts
This list includes all Hungarian female artistic gymnasts who have won at least four medals at the Olympic Games or the World Artistic Gymnastics Championships combined or at least one individual medal.  Medals won in the Team Portable Apparatus at the 1952 or 1956 Olympic Games are located under the Team column and are designated with an asterisk (*).

Hall of Famers 
The following Hungarian gymnasts have been inducted into the International Gymnastics Hall of Fame:
 Ágnes Keleti (2002)
 Henrietta Ónodi (2010)
 Margit Korondi (2021)
 Olga Tass (2021)

See also 
List of Olympic female artistic gymnasts for Hungary

References

Gymnastics in Hungary
National women's artistic gymnastics teams
Gymnastics